Maria Elena Camerin (born 21 March 1982) is a former professional tennis player from Italy.

In her career, Camerin won three doubles titles on the WTA Tour, as well as ten singles and nine doubles titles on the ITF Circuit. On 11 October 2004, she reached her best singles ranking of world No. 41. On 31 July 2006, she peaked at No. 33 in the doubles rankings.

Playing for Italy Fed Cup team, Camerin has a win–loss record of 1–5.

Career
In July 2001, Camerin had her first WTA Tour singles runner-up in Casablanca where she lost the final against Zsófia Gubacsi.

In July 2006, she won her biggest doubles title at the Cincinnati Open, partnering Gisela Dulko. In September, in Portorož at the Slovenia Open, she lost the final against Tamira Paszek in straight sets.

Camerin withdrew from the 2006 Tashkent Open doubles final due to injury.

In 2012, she defeated Garbiñe Muguruza in the second qualifying round of the Wimbledon Championships.

Significant finals

Premier Mandatory/Premier-5 finals

Doubles: 1 (title)

WTA career finals

Singles: 2 (2 runner-ups)

Doubles: 6 (3 titles, 3 runner-ups)

ITF finals

Singles: 18 (10–8)

Doubles: 17 (9–8)

Grand Slam performance timelines

Singles

Doubles

Head-to-head records
Players who have been ranked world No. 1 are in boldface.

 Dinara Safina 1–4
 Sorana Cîrstea 0–2
 Anastasia Pavlyuchenkova 0–1
 Jelena Kostanić 0–4
 Flavia Pennetta 0–4
 Daniela Hantuchová 0–2
 Elena Dementieva 0–4
 Patty Schnyder 0–1
 Victoria Azarenka 0–1
 Francesca Schiavone 0–3
 Samantha Stosur 2–1
 Maria Sharapova 1–1
 Ai Sugiyama 0–1
 Jelena Janković 0–4
Amélie Mauresmo 0–2
 Jelena Dokić 1–0
 Conchita Martínez 0–2
 Li Na 1–2
 Kim Clijsters 0–2
 Caroline Wozniacki 0–2
 Lindsay Davenport 0–2
 Anastasia Myskina 1–1
 Justine Henin 0–2
 Serena Williams''' 0–1
 Nadia Petrova 0–2
 Petra Kvitová 0–2
 Paola Suárez 0–2
 Alicia Molik 0–1
 Marion Bartoli 1–4

External links

 
 
 

1982 births
Living people
People from Motta di Livenza
Italian female tennis players
Tennis players at the 2004 Summer Olympics
Olympic tennis players of Italy
Sportspeople from the Province of Treviso